Power Rangers RPM is the seventeenth season of the television series Power Rangers and is an adaptation of Engine Sentai Go-onger, the thirty-second Japanese Super Sentai series.

The season was the eighth and final to air on ABC stations, premiering March 7, 2009 on ABC. Due to the low ratings of the preceding season, Jungle Fury, RPM was also the final season to be produced and distributed by Disney and Renaissance-Atlantic Entertainment, putting the series on a one-year hiatus until the premiere of Power Rangers Samurai in 2011.

Power Rangers Beast Morphers (2019), which was produced by the franchise's current owner Hasbro, through its Allspark entertainment division, was its direct sequel.

Story
An AI computer virus named Venjix takes over all of the Earth's computers, creates an army of robot "Grinder" droids and destroys or enslaves almost all of humanity. Only the city of Corinth remains, protected by an almost impenetrable force field from the toxic atmosphere of the wasteland outside. To combat Venjix's encroaching evil, the mysterious Doctor K creates the RPM Power Rangers to fight him off and recruits Air Force pilot Scott Truman, hero obsessed Flynn McAllistair, and reformed airhead socialite Summer Landsdown to operate their weapons and gear. Later, Doctor K recruits Dillon, a rebellious drifter whom Venjix had experimented on, and Ziggy Grover, an inept thief whom Dillon begrudgingly befriended, as 'Series Black and Green'.

During their fight against Venjix, Dillon attempts to recover his memories of his life before being experimented upon, eventually leading him to discover that Venjix's general Tenaya was actually his sister; his attempts to get her to rebel against Venjix are met with resistance not only from Tenaya, but also Venjix, who has her upgraded in order to suppress her remaining humanity. It is also revealed that Doctor K was the one who created Venjix, having intended to only use it to escape her confinement in the treacherous Alphabet Soup program along with 'test pilots' Gem and Gemma, but was intercepted before she had a chance to install the safety protocols, allowing Venjix to escape into the outside world. Gem and Gemma are ultimately shown to have survived Venjix's assault on Earth, having recovered the prototype 'Series Gold and Silver' Ranger gear when escaping Alphabet Soup.

Eventually, Venjix, having created a body for himself in order to personally destroy the Rangers, manages to infiltrate and attack Corinth, taking over the city and crippling the Rangers in the process. However, Tenaya eventually defects from Venjix and helps fight back, resulting in a building destroying Venjix. In the aftermath, Scott, Gem, and Gemma lead a fighter squad run by Scott's father, Ziggy and Doctor K intend to open a children's school, and Dillon, Summer, and Tenaya leave Corinth to help rebuild Earth.

Cast and characters
RPM Rangers
 Eka Darville as Scott Truman, Ranger Operator Series Red.
 Ari Boyland as Flynn McAllistair, Ranger Operator Series Blue.
 Rose McIver as Summer Landsdown, Ranger Operator Series Yellow.
 Milo Cawthorne as Ziggy Grover, Ranger Operator Series Green.
 Dan Ewing as Dillon, Ranger Operator Series Black and Tenaya's Brother.
 Mike Ginn as Gem, Ranger Operator Series Gold.
 Li Ming Hu as Gemma, Ranger Operator Series Silver.

Supporting characters
 Olivia Tennet as Dr. K.
 James Gaylyn as Colonel Mason Truman.
 Damien Avery as Colonel Hicks.
 Mia Koning as Vasquez.
 Murray Keane as Benny.

Villains
 Andrew Laing as the voice of Venjix Virus.
 Adelaide Kane as Tenaya.
 Mark Mitchinson as the voice of General Shifter.
 Charlie McDermott as the voice of General Crunch.
 Leighton Cardno as the voice of General Kilobyte.
 John Sumner as Fresno Bob.
 Gary Young as Ronin.

Episodes

Production
Australian actor Eka Darville, who previously starred in series three of Blue Water High, was reported to have a role in September 2008 in what was then unknown as RPM or Racing Performance Machines which began production in September 2008 in New Zealand. Heidi Kathy Bradhurt had been cast as an extra, but her profile initially listed her as the Yellow Ranger, named "Kayla," whose name and actress had since been changed to "Summer" played by Rose McIver. Daniel Ewing had been reported in November 2008 to be playing a major character named "Dillon," revealed to be the Black Ranger. Other cast members include Murray Keane in the role of "Benny", Charlie McDermott voicing "General Crunch", and Jason Hoyte as a guest role named "Mr. McAllistair".

An article of The New Zealand Herald reported that Power Rangers RPM was to be the final season of the Power Rangers series. Production manager Sally Campbell stated in an interview "...at this stage we will not be shooting another season". A September 1, 2009, revision to Disney A to Z: The Official Encyclopedia by Disney's then-head archivist Dave Smith stated that production of new episodes of Power Rangers ceased in 2009. A re-version of Mighty Morphin Power Rangers began broadcasting in early 2010 instead. However, in mid-2010, Haim Saban bought the Power Rangers franchise back from Disney and production was restarted during that year for a 2011 series.

Jungle Fury (which was said to have low ratings) was originally set to be the final season, but obligations with Bandai forced Disney to produce one more season.

Reception
Flixist ranked it second-best out of twenty seasons, remarking "showrunners decided to go for broke and throw everything they had into creating a post-apocalyptic film for kids. Lifting creative elements from films like Mad Max and Terminator, then adding a Power Rangers layer helped give this season a vibe no other season had before. It was more creatively cemented than years past, and actually had good cinematography". Geeky Brummie ranked it third, saying "Dillon and Ziggy are two of the best rangers and work fantastically together. The season also has some of the most surprising revelations in the franchise’s history". Comic Art Community ranked it fourth, saying "The childlike elements of the base material were generally ignored for a very dark, adult season of the show that involved the attempted genocide of mankind which included various character deaths in the show". Eric Francisco, writing for Inverse, called it the darkest, the best, and "smart, clever, and so hysterically funny that it should stand shoulder-to-shoulder with the best cult science-fiction series", and echoed the connections to Mad Max and Terminator.

Comics
In 2018, the RPM Rangers appeared in Boom! Studios's "Shattered Grid", a crossover event between teams from all eras commemorating the 25th anniversary of the original television series. It was published in Mighty Morphin Power Rangers #25-30 and various tie-ins. A Power Rangers RPM story by Anthony Burch and Dylan Burnett was published in Mighty Morphin Power Rangers 2018 Annual as part of the crossover.

References

External links

 Official Power Rangers Website
 

 
RPM
2000s American science fiction television series
2009 American television series debuts
2009 American television series endings
American Broadcasting Company original programming
American children's action television series
American children's adventure television series
American children's fantasy television series
English-language television shows
Cyberpunk television series
Malware in fiction
Post-apocalyptic television series
Television series about parallel universes
Television series about siblings
Television series about twins
Television series by Disney
Television shows filmed in New Zealand
Television shows set in Australia
Television series created by Haim Saban